Godahl is an unincorporated community in Brown and Watonwan counties in the U.S. state of Minnesota.

Location
Godahl sits on the boundary line for Brown and Watonwan counties, occupying two counties. The community is located between Sleepy Eye and St. James on Minnesota State Highway 4. The community is located at the junction of Minnesota State Highway 4 with County Roads 6 and 10.

History
Godahl was settled by Norwegian immigrants and named in honor of their home, called Gode Dahl ("Good Valley").  The town had a post office from 1894 until 1907, and a station of the Chicago, St. Paul, Minneapolis and Omaha Railway.  The community failed to develop, and for many years the only remnant of its commercial aspirations was the Godahl Store, a cooperative built in 1894 and now listed on the National Register of Historic Places.  The store closed on December 31, 2016.

References

Unincorporated communities in Minnesota
Unincorporated communities in Brown County, Minnesota
Unincorporated communities in Watonwan County, Minnesota